Sultan Mohammed Khan (19 February 1919 – 8 November 2010) was a Pakistani civil servant and British India Army officer who served as a Foreign Secretary of Pakistan. He was also  Pakistan's ambassador to the United States in the Nixon and Jimmy Carter presidency.

Early life
Sultan Mohammed Khan was born in Jaora State, British India, on 19 February 1919. He received his bachelor's degree from Ewing Christian College.

Career
Sultan Mohammed Khan joined the British Indian army as an officer cadet and was commissioned as a lieutenant in the 4th Indian Grenadiers, during  World War II he served in India and the Malays-Indonesia front. He took an early release from the British Indian army as a major and after independence of Pakistan from the British, Khan joined the Pakistan's foreign service.

During his career as a diplomat, he served as a Pakistan ambassador to the United States, Canada, China, and Japan.

Personal life
He married daughter of Jaora State ruler, Nawabzadi Abeda Sultan, in 1943. The couple had four children. He emigrated to the United States and lived a retired life in Maryland, United States.

Book
Memories & Reflections of a Pakistani Diplomat (1999)

References

External links 
 Former Foreign Secretaries Government of Pakistan

1919 births
2010 deaths
British Indian Army officers
20th-century Pakistani writers
Ambassadors of Pakistan to the United States
Indian emigrants to Pakistan
Pakistani emigrants to the United States
Foreign Secretaries of Pakistan
People from Jaora
University of Allahabad alumni